The  Eastern League season began on approximately April 1 and the regular season ended on approximately September 1. 

The Harrisburg Senators defeated the Vermont Reds three games to one to win the Eastern League Championship Series.

Regular season

Standings

Notes:
Green shade indicates that team advanced to the playoffs
Bold indicates that team advanced to ELCS
Italics indicates that team won ELCS

Playoffs

Semi-finals Series
Harrisburg Senators defeated Reading Phillies 3 games to 2.

Vermont Reds defeated Pittsfield Cubs 3 games to 1.

Championship Series
Harrisburg Senators defeated Vermont Reds 3 games to 1.

Attendance

References

External links
1987 Eastern League Review at thebaseballcube.com

Eastern League seasons